Documented Nahuatl words in the Spanish language (mostly as spoken in Mexico and Mesoamerica) include an extensive list of words that represent (i) animals, (ii) plants, fruit and vegetables, (iii) foods and beverages, and (iv) domestic appliances.

Many of these words end with the absolutive suffix "-tl" in Nahuatl. This word ending—thought to be difficult for Spanish speakers to pronounce at the time—evolved in Spanish into a "-te" ending (e.g. axolotl = ajolote). As a  rule of thumb, a Spanish word for an animal, plant, food or home appliance widely used in Mexico and ending in "-te" is highly likely to have a Nahuatl origin.

Animals
Acocil (crayfish)
Ajolote (axolotl)
Cacomixtle
Chapulín (grasshopper)
Cenzontle (mockingbird)
Coyote
Escamoles (ant eggs)
Guachinango (red snapper)
Guajolote (turkey)
Ocelote (ocelot)
Mapache (raccoon)
Mayate (beetle)
Moyote (mosquito)
Pinacate
Pizote (Coati)
Quetzal
Tecolote (owl)
Tepezcuintle
Techalote (squirrel)
Tlacuache (opossum)
Xoloitzcuintli (Mexican Hairless Dog)
Zanate (Grackle)
Zopilote  (vulture)

Plants, fruits and vegetables

Foods and drinks

Names of places
Countries
 Cuauhtemallan  (Guatemala)
 Mehxico  (México)
 Nicanahuac  (Nicaragua)
 Cozcatlan  (El Salvador)

States/Provinces/Departments
 Zacatecas, possibly
 Tlaxcala (Mex)
 Tabasco (Mex)
 Jalisco (Mex)
 México (Mex)
 Oaxaca (Mex)
 Chimaltenango (Guatemela)
 Escuintla (Guatemela)
 Huehuetenango (Guatemela)
 Quetzaltenango (Guatemela)
 Sacatepéquez (Guatemela)
 Cuscatlán Department (El Salvador)

Cities
Nezahualcoyotl
Texcoco
Xochimilco
Iztacalco
Iztapalapa
Tacuba
Chapultepec
Tepeyac
Oaxtepec
 Culiacán
 Mazatlán
 Mexico-Tenochtitlán (former center of the Aztec Empire, now Mexico City)
 Xalapa
 Countless other cities throughout Mexico and northern Central America

Geographical elemants
 Iztaccíhuatl (a volcano)
 Popocatépetl (a volcano)
 Citlaltépetl (a volcano)
 Xinantecatl (a volcano)
 Sahuayo

Other terms, includes home appliances

See also
 Nahuatl–Spanish contact
List of English words of Spanish origin
 List of English words of Nahuatl origin
 Influences on the Spanish language
 Indigenous languages of the Americas

References

External links
 Nahuatl Wikipedia

Nahuatl

Mexico-related lists